Croswell can refer to:

People
 Charles Croswell, Michigan governor
 Edwin Croswell, 19th-century journalist
 Harry Croswell, 19th-century journalist and clergyman
 Ken Croswell, astronomer
 Mary Ann Croswell, English silversmith
 Walter J. Croswell, American farmer and politician

Places
 Croswell, Michigan, United States